Marko Cheremshyna (other name: Ivan Semaniuk, Іван Семанюк), (born 13 June 1874 in Kobaky, Galicia; died 25 April 1927 in Kobaky) was a Ukrainian writer of Hutsul background.

Biography 

Cheremshyna earned a law degree from the University of Vienna in 1906 and maintained a law practice in Sniatyn.  He started writing short stories around 1896 and published them in newspapers and journals. Because of his birth region, Cheremshyna is often placed together with Vasyl Stefanyk and Les Martovych in the 'Pokutia triad.' However, Cheremshyna's stories differ from the other two writers significantly.  He is known for his portrayals of peasant life.  His works incorporate the dialect and folk themes of his birthplace.  He also translated short stories into Ukrainian from German, Czech, and Hungarian.

There is a museum of him in Sniatyn, Galicia where he is buried.

References 
  
Marko Cheremshyna at the Encyclopedia of Ukraine

1874 births
1927 deaths
People from Ivano-Frankivsk Oblast
Ukrainian Austro-Hungarians
People from the Kingdom of Galicia and Lodomeria
Hutsuls
Ukrainian people of Rusyn descent
Ukrainian male short story writers
Ukrainian short story writers
20th-century Ukrainian lawyers
Austro-Hungarian lawyers
University of Vienna alumni